Igate Manor is a manor in the historical region of Vidzeme, in northern Latvia. It was designed by architect Rudolf Heinrich Zirkwitz.
In the 1920s Igate Manor was nationalized in accordance with Latvian Land Reform of 1920.

See also
List of palaces and manor houses in Latvia

References

External links 

 About Igate Manor

Manor houses in Latvia